Each team in the 2015 FIFA Club World Cup had to name a 23-man squad (three of whom had to be goalkeepers) by the FIFA deadline of 30 November 2015. Injury replacements were allowed until 24 hours before the team's first match.

América
Manager:  Ignacio Ambríz

Auckland City
Manager:  Ramon Tribulietx

Barcelona
Manager:  Luis Enrique

Guangzhou Evergrande Taobao
Manager:  Luiz Felipe Scolari

TP Mazembe
Manager:  Patrice Carteron

River Plate
Manager:  Marcelo Gallardo

Sanfrecce Hiroshima
Manager: Hajime Moriyasu

References

Squads
FIFA Club World Cup squads